The Strait of Belle Isle is a waterway in eastern Canada that separates the Labrador Peninsula from the island of Newfoundland, in the province of Newfoundland and Labrador.

Location
The strait is the northern outlet for the Gulf of Saint Lawrence, the other two being the Cabot Strait and Strait of Canso. As such, it is also considered part of the Great Lakes-St. Lawrence Seaway system.

Origins of name

The name is derived from the island of Belle Isle (French for "Beautiful Island"), which is at the extreme eastern end of the strait and roughly equidistant from Table Head, Labrador, and Cape Bauld, Newfoundland.

History
Both the island of Newfoundland as well as the Labrador region which surrounds the Strait of Belle Isle have been inhabited by Indigenous Peoples for millennia. The surrounding land environment has historically been replete with caribou and other mammals. Harbour seals, grey seals, ringed seals and many other aquatic species are found in the strait itself. 

An unnamed manuscript references Viking nomenclature for Labrador and Newfoundland, (Markland and Vinland, respectively), and appears to note the existence of the Strait of Belle Isle: "And if such is the case, then an ocean flows into a strait between Markland and Vínland."

Basque whalers visited the area throughout the 17th century and into the first decade of the 18th century, with the wreckage site of the San Juan at Red Bay dating as early as 1565. Basque seafarers also came into contact with the Inuit, which either led to conflict or collaboration over sealing areas.

Navigation and transport
Navigation in the strait can be extremely hazardous with strong tidal currents interacting with the Labrador Current, depths reaching several hundred metres in places, sea ice for 8 to 10 months of the year, and variable weather conditions including gales and fog. While sea ice prevents year-round shipping, the Canadian Coast Guard maintains a vessel traffic service (VTS) to ensure collisions do not occur. The VTS is voluntary currently.

A ferry service operates at the western part of strait between St. Barbe, Newfoundland, and Blanc Sablon, Quebec.  New road construction for the Trans-Labrador Highway resulted in the removal of ferry services to outports in the northeastern part of the strait in 2002.

Fixed link

The idea of building a fixed link across the strait between Labrador and Newfoundland, known as the Newfoundland-Labrador fixed link, has been raised numerous times in recent decades following an unsuccessful attempt to build a tunnel carrying electrical wires in the mid-1970s.  If such a link were built, it would likely be a  submerged rail tunnel.  The proposal is meant to reduce the province's reliance upon the Marine Atlantic ferry service to Nova Scotia, but the project's high costs and lack of suitable road network between Labrador and Quebec have been cited as major obstacles.

In 1975, the Progressive Conservative government led by Frank Moores committed to building a tunnel across the strait. A hole was dug on the Labrador side and the government spent $75-million before the project was abandoned.

The October 2003 provincial election resulted in the newly elected Progressive Conservative government announcing joint federal-provincial funding for a study of the concept. A pre-feasibility report was released in February 2005, which concluded that a tunnel bored using tunnel boring machines, with an electric train shuttle to transport vehicles is the most technically and economically attractive option. The estimated construction cost of the fixed link was $1.2 billion (2004$) and total development cost of about $1.7 billion.

In 2016, Premier Dwight Ball launched a new pre-feasibility study to determine the costs of a tunnel link between the island and Labrador. The study released its results in April 2018, and concluded that a  undersea rail tunnel connecting L'Anse Amour in southern Labrador and Yankee Point near Flower's Cove on the Northern Peninsula of Newfoundland could be constructed at a cost of C$1.65 billion.

In their 2019 election platform, the Liberal Party of Canada indicated support for a National Infrastructure Fund, including the Newfoundland-Labrador fixed transportation link, likely linking Yankee Point, Newfoundland with Point Amour on the (Labrador) mainland.

A  submarine cable across the strait is under construction as part of the Lower Churchill Project.

References

Further reading 

 Auger, Réginald. Labrador Inuit and Europeans in the Strait of Belle Isle From the Written Sources to the Archæological Evidence. Collection Nordicana, no 55. Québec, Canada: Centre d'études nordiques, Université Laval, 1991.
 Bailey, W. B., and H. B. Hachey. Hydrographic Features of the Strait of Belle Isle. St. Andrews, N.B.: Atlantic Oceanographic Group, 1951.
 Bock, Allan. Out of Necessity The Story of Sealskin Boots in the Strait of Belle Isle. Shoal Cove East, Nfld: GNP Craft Producers, 1991.
 Bostock, H. H., L. M. Cumming, and Harold Williams. Geology of the Strait of Belle Isle Area, Northwestern Insular Newfoundland, Southern Labrador, and Adjacent Quebec. Ottawa, Canada: Geological Survey of Canada, 1983. 
 Dawson, W. Bell. The Currents in Belle Isle Strait, the Northern Entrance to the Gulf of St. Lawrence. The Bulletin of the Geographical Society of Philadelphia, No. 1-2, January–April, 1920. Philadelphia: The Society, 1920.
 Jeffers, George W. Observations on the Cod-Fishery in the Strait of Belle Isle. Toronto: Biological Board of Canada, 1931.
 LeGrow, Keith Herbert. Distribution of Marine Birds in Relation to Water Masses and Fronts in the Strait of Belle Isle, Northwestern Atlantic Ocean. Ottawa: National Library of Canada, 2001. 
 May, A. W. Biological Data on Cod from the Summer Fishery on the North Shore Strait of Belle Isle. [Ottawa]: Fisheries Research Board of Canada, 1968.
 McGhee, Robert, and James A. Tuck. An Archaic Sequence from the Strait of Belle Isle, Labrador. Mercury series. Ottawa: National Museums of Canada, 1975.
 Murphy, Joe. The Strait of Belle Isle Fixed Link. 2004.
 Ney, C. H. Triangulation in Newfoundland, West Coast and Strait of Belle Isle. Ottawa: Edmond Cloutier, 1948.
 Sobieniak, J. W. A Study of Air Services Across the Strait of Belle Isle. Ottawa: Canadian Transport Commission, Systems Analysis Branch, 1972.

External links 
 Strait of Belle Isle ecoregion
 World VTS Guide

Belle Isle